Aas is a 1973 Pakistani Urdu romantic drama film directed by Ali Sufiyan Afaqi. The lead cast included Shabnam, Muhammad Ali, Aqeel, Nanha, Saiqa, and Qavi. Aas won 8 Nigar Awards in different categories, including the best film of the year. The film was also exhibited at the Tashkent International Film Festival in the Soviet Union in 1987.

Cast
 Shabnam
 Muhammad Ali
 Aqeel
 Nanha
 Saiqa
 Qavi
 Nirala
 Meena Chaudhary
 Najma Mehboob
 Sentosh Rissal
 Saqi

Music and soundtracks
The playback music was composed by Nisar Bazmi:

 Bol Ri, Guria Bol, Zara... Singer(s): Nayyara Noor, Poet: Masroor Anwar
 Ham Nay Dekhay Is Dunya Mein Kaisay Kaisy Niralay Log... Singer(s): Noor Jehan, Poet: Masroor Anwar
 Jayie, Shouq Say Jayie... Singer(s): Runa Laila, Poet: Masroor Anwar
 Koi Yun Bhi Roothta Hay, Mana Meri Khata Hay... Singer(s): Noor Jehan, Ahmad Rushdi, Poet: Masroor Anwar
 Lakh Nakhray Dikhao, Sar Jhukana Paray Ga... Singer(s): Noor Jehan, Poet: Masroor Anwar
 Meri Marzi, Main To Gaun Gi... Singer(s): Runa Laila, Poet: Taslim Fazli

Release and box office
Aas was released on 10 August 1973. The film was a golden jubilee hit.

Awards

References

1973 films
Pakistani romantic musical films
1970s Urdu-language films
Nigar Award winners
1973 romantic drama films
Pakistani romantic drama films
Urdu-language Pakistani films